Epichorista fraudulenta is a species of moth of the family Tortricidae. It is found in New Zealand.

The wingspan is 11–14 mm. The forewings of the males are dark slate brown, strigulated (finely streaked) with ferruginous or red. The hindwings are greyish fuscous. Females have brown forewings, mixed with yellow, ferruginous or reddish. The hindwings are fuscous.

References

Moths described in 1928
Epichorista
Moths of New Zealand